In Mexico, a Yorkino is a specific Masonic Lodge belonging to the York Rite order of Freemasonry as opposed to Scottish Rite.

Etymology
The name Yorkino derived from the city of York where, according to masonic legend, the first meetings of masons are thought to have taken place in England. Several groups of Freemasons established themselves in political circles in Mexico during the 1820s and were called Yorkinos.

History

References
"Yorkino." Encyclopædia Britannica. 2010. Encyclopædia Britannica Online. 12 July 2010 <http://www.britannica.com/EBchecked/topic/1242221/Yorkino>.

Freemasonry